Tiruchotruturai is a village in the Thiruvaiyaru taluk of the Thanjavur district in Tamil Nadu, India. The Odhanavaneswarar Temple, a Padal Petra Sthalam dedicated to Shiva, is located here.

Population 

According to the 2001 census, the village had a population of 2,202 with 1,093 men and 1,109 women in 522 households. The sex ratio was 1,015. The literacy rate was 67.69.

References 

 Website of 2001 census

Villages in Thanjavur district